The Shore Lunch 200 was an ARCA Menards Series race held at the Madison International Speedway in Rutland, Wisconsin. It was 100 miles in length.

Past winners

 2012: Race extended due to a Green–white–checker finish.

References

External links 
 Racing-Reference.info – Madison International Speedway

2011 establishments in Wisconsin
ARCA Menards Series races
Motorsport in Wisconsin
Recurring sporting events established in 2011
Recurring sporting events disestablished in 2020